Läckö Castle (Swedish: Läckö Slott ) is a medieval castle in Sweden, located on Kållandsö island on Lake Vänern, 25 kilometers north of Lidköping in Västergötland, Sweden.

History
Brynolf Algotsson,  Bishop of the Diocese of Skara, laid the foundations for a fortified castle in 1298 originally as a fort that consisted of two or three houses surrounded by a wall. After a fire during the 1470s, the fort was expanded by Bishop Brynolf Gerlachsson (1458-1505). 

Following the Reformation in 1527, King Gustav Vasa took possession. Field Marshal Jacob Pontusson De la Gardie (1583–1652) was granted the property in 1615. Field Marshal de la Gardie embarked on an extensive building spree, including the third floor of the keep. The portal to the main courtyard was added during his period, as were the frescos depicting people and winding plants found in niches, stairwells and the rooms on the third floor. 

In 1654, Count Magnus Gabriel De la Gardie (1622–1686) initiated major construction projects at Läckö. A fourth floor was built in the main building and a number of artists were hired to decorate the walls and ceilings of the castle.

Läckö was later granted  to Count Carl Gustaf Tessin (1695–1770) in 1752 and in 1810 to General Carl Johan Adlercreutz (1757–1815).

Today
Läckö Castle is a national monument and has been managed by the National Property Board since 1993. The National Property Board (Swedish: Statens fastighetsverk), the Foundation of Läckö Castle (Swedish: Stiftelsen Läckö Slott) and the National Museum of Fine Arts (Swedish: Nationalmuseum) work together to maintain and furnish the castle in the style of the Baroque period. 
Läckö Castle Opera  (Swedish: Läckö Slottsopera) puts on an annual opera production in the castle's inner courtyard, with performances for about three weeks beginning in the middle of July.

References

Other Sources
The Splendour of The Baroque. Läcko Castle, A Nobleman’s Home in Sweden’s Age of Greatness (Lars Sjöberg and Anneli Welin. Stockholm: National Museum of Fine Arts. Text in Swedish. 2001)

External links

 Läckö Slott official web site
Statens fastighetsverk: National Property Board
Stiftelsen Läckö Slott: The Foundation of Läckö Slott

Castles in Västra Götaland County
Museums in Västra Götaland County
Historic house museums in Sweden